Pandharkawda is a City and a Municipal council in Yavatmal district in the Indian state of Maharashtra. The Pandharkawada municipality won "Best Municipality at Amravati Division" in 2006 and a quality of education award in 2011. It is near the Saikheda Dam, an earthfill dam on the Khuni River..

Agriculture

Kharip Crops 
Jowar, Cotton, Groundnut and rice are the major kharip crops.

Jowar – grows in talukas such as Pusad, Ner, Mahagaon, Umarkhed, Maregaon, Ghatanji, Wani and Zari Jamni.

Cotton – major talukas are Ghatanji, Wani, Pusad, Umarkhed, Mahagaon and Ner.

Groundnut - talukas such as Pusad, Digras, Darwha, Arni, Ghatanji etc.

Rabi Crops 
Wheat and gram are the important crops. Rabi sesame and linseed (Jawas) are grown along with these crops.

Wheat – talukas lying in river basins of Wardha and Painganga. Umarkhed, Pusad, Wani, Digras, Maregaon and Zari Jamni are the largest. Talukas such as Arni, Ghatanji and Yavatmal also take this crop.

Gram – talukas such as Umarkhed, Wani, Ralegaon, Maregaon, Pusad, Digras, Ghatanji and Babhulgaon.

Irrigated crops 
Sugarcane, bananas, Oranges, Grapes and betel leaves are important irrigated crops.

Sugar cane – Pusad, Umarkhed and Mahagaon talukas

Bananas and oranges – Zadgaon, Ralegaon, Kalamb and Dabha-Pahur regions

Grapes – Pusad and Umarkhed region

Betel leaves - Lalkhed, Darwha, Digras and Umarkhed region

Demographics
 India census, Pandharkawada had a population of 26,567. Males constitute 51% of the population and females 49%. Pandharkawada has an average literacy rate of 74%, significantly higher than the national average of 59.5%. Male literacy is at 80%, while female literacy is 68%. In Pandharkawada, 13% of the population is under age 6.

Transport
Pandharkawada is located on National Highway 7 on Nagpur-Hyderabad section. MSRTC buses connect the city to Nagpur, Ghatanji, Yavatmal, Chandrapur, Amravati, Akola, Nanded, Aurangabad, Adilabad, Pune and Hyderabad.

Geography
Dense forests are found in Pandharkawada. Tipeshwar is one of the two wildlife sanctuaries in the city and the most well-known forest of the district. Trees such as teak, bamboo, tendu, hirda, apta and moha live in the forests. Tiger, bear, deer, nilgai, sambar, hyena  and the national bird, the peacock, are found in the forests. 
A suspected man eating tigress, with 13 victims attributed was active in this area in Oct/Nov 2018  and was shot dead on November 2, 2018.

References

Cities and towns in Yavatmal district